The 2022 WAFF Beach Soccer Championship was the 2nd edition of the WAFF Beach Soccer Championship, organised by the West Asian Football Federation (WAFF). The tournament was held from 18 to 23 May 2022. Jordan, Qatar, Iraq, Syria, Yemen didn't participate in the tournament.

Participating nations
Seven Teams entered the WAFF Beach Soccer Championship final tournament.

Group stage

Group A

Group B

Knockout stage

Semi-finals

Third place match

Final

5th-7th Matches

Statistics

Goalscorers

References

2022 in Asian football
2022 in beach soccer
WAFF
WAFF